Midd-West High School is a small, rural high school located at 540 E Main Street, Middleburg, Snyder County, Pennsylvania. It is the sole high school operated by Midd-West School District. In 2013, Midd-West High School's enrollment was 795 students in grades 8th through 12th. 
Students may choose to attend the SUN Area Technical Institute in New Berlin, Pennsylvania for training in the building trades, allied health services, automotive repairs, culinary arts as well as computer technology. Fees for attendance are paid by Midd-West School District. The Central Susquehanna Intermediate Unit IU16 provides the district with a wide variety of services like specialized education for disabled students and hearing, speech and visual disability services and professional development for staff and faculty.

Extracurriculars
The Midd-West School District offers students a wide variety of clubs, activities and an extensive sports program.

Sports
MWSD's mascot is the mustang. School colors are Carolina blue and dull silver. Just before the merger of the two high schools, high school students were asked to vote on a new mascot and school colors to replace the old West Snyder HS Mounties (colors: red and white) and Middleburg HS Middies (colors: blue and gold). 
The district funds:

Boys
Baseball - AAAA
Basketball - AAAA
Football in cooperative agreement Juniata County School District 
Bowling - AAAAAA
Cross country - AA
Golf - AA
Soccer - AA
Track and field - AA
Wrestling - AA

Girls
Basketball - AAAA
Bowling - AAAAAA
Cheer - AAAAA
Cross country - AA
Field hockey - A
Lacrosse - AA
Soccer - AA
Softball - AAAA
Track and field - AA

According to PIAA directory July 2012 

Note: The football program was a co-operative program with East Juniata High School, and plays under the East Juniata flag (Colors: Red & gray, nicknamel: Tigers), even though their field is in Beaver Springs on Midd-West property. The school board paid $24,000 a year for the students to be able to play PIAA football. In 2017, the agreement was ended by East Juniata.

Midd-West School District is a member of the Pennsylvania Heartland Athletic Conference for all athletics, except for football, which is in the All-American Football Conference (as the East Juniata Tigers). Midd-West School District participates under the rules and guidelines of the Pennsylvania Interscholastic Athletic Association. The Pennsylvania Heartland Athletic Conference is a voluntary association of 25 PIAA High Schools within the central Pennsylvania region.

References

External links
 SUN Tech
 Midd-West board ponders building options, costs
 Central Susquehanna Intermediate Unit 16

Susquehanna Valley
Schools in Snyder County, Pennsylvania
Public high schools in Pennsylvania
High schools in Central Pennsylvania